Witherden is a surname. Notable people with the surname include:

Alex Witherden (born 1998), Australian rules footballer
Errol Witherden (1922–2009), South African cricketer
Ted Witherden (1922–2019), English cricketer